Mikkel Michelsen (born 19 August 1994) is a Danish speedway rider.

Career
Born in Nykøbing Falster, Michelsen took up speedway at the age of 6, and went on to win the Junior World Cup in both 2008 and 2009.

He rode for Slangerup Speedway Klub in the Danish league from 2010. After racing in Germany for AC Landshut Devils in 2012, he rode in Poland and the United Kingdom in 2013 for Unia Leszno and Eastbourne Eagles respectively, staying with both teams in 2014.

In 2013 he won the Danish Under 21 Individual Speedway Championship, the European Junior Championship, and the Under-21 World Cup with Denmark.

In 2014 he was a reserve in the Danish Speedway Grand Prix and finished third in the World Under-21 Championship after also reaching the final in 2011 and 2013.

In December 2014, with the Eagles dropping to the National League, he signed for Leicester Lions for the 2015 Elite League season, and also signed to ride for Ostrów in the Polish league.

In 2022, he finished in 11th place during the 2022 Speedway World Championship, after securing 82 points during the 2022 Speedway Grand Prix and was selected as a full time rider for the 2023 Speedway Grand Prix. Also in 2022, he helped Lublin win the 2022 Ekstraliga.

Major results

World individual Championship
2015 Speedway Grand Prix - 21st
2018 Speedway Grand Prix - 29th
2019 Speedway Grand Prix - 17th
2020 Speedway Grand Prix - 14th
2021 Speedway Grand Prix - 18th
2022 Speedway Grand Prix - 11th

World team Championships
2021 Speedway of Nations - 3rd
2022 Speedway of Nations - 4th

References

1994 births
Living people
Danish speedway riders
Eastbourne Eagles riders
Leicester Lions riders
People from Guldborgsund Municipality
Sportspeople from Region Zealand